The 1953 NC State Wolfpack football team represented North Carolina State University during the 1953 college football season. The Wolfpack were led by second-year head coach Horace Hendrickson and played their home games at Riddick Stadium in Raleigh, North Carolina. They competed as members of the Atlantic Coast Conference in the league's inaugural year, after NC State and the other ACC schools split off from the Southern Conference. They finished winless in conference with a 0–3 record, and a 1–9 record overall. Hendrickson resigned as head coach following the end of the season.

Schedule

References

NC State
NC State Wolfpack football seasons
NC State Wolfpack football